Lopon is a spiritual degree given in Tibetan Buddhism equal to M. A.

References

Tibetan Buddhist titles